Bobbo Petersson (born 11 May 1992) is a Swedish ice hockey defenceman. He is currently playing with Södertälje SK of the HockeyAllsvenskan (Allsv). He made his Elitserien debut playing with Linköpings HC during the 2012–13 Elitserien season.

References

External links

1992 births
Living people
Swedish ice hockey defencemen
Linköping HC players
Örebro HK players
Djurgårdens IF Hockey players
People from Karlskrona
Sportspeople from Blekinge County